Rozdilna (transliteration Rozdíl’na) is a small city in Odesa Oblast (province) of southern Ukraine. It is the administrative center of Rozdilna Raion (district), and was founded in 1863. Rozdilna hosts ther administratiuon of Rozdilna urban hromada, one of the hromadas of Ukraine. Population:

History

Climate

References

External links
 

Populated places established in 1863
Cities in Odesa Oblast
Kherson Governorate
Cities of district significance in Ukraine
Populated places established in the Russian Empire
Rozdilna Raion